The Frank Brooder House, at 303 North St. in Fromberg, Montana, was listed on the National Register of Historic Places in 1993.

It is a brick two-and-a-half-story square-plan Colonial Revival-style house with a hipped roof, on a brick foundation.  The brick is laid in English bond.

References

Houses on the National Register of Historic Places in Montana
Colonial Revival architecture in Montana
Houses completed in 1911
Houses in Carbon County, Montana
National Register of Historic Places in Carbon County, Montana